Khaireni is a Bazar at Hasara in Gulmi district. It has a Government Hospital. The nearest School is Shree Satyawati Higher Secondary School.

References

Khaireni at geoview

Bazaars in Nepal